The  Honda Indy 200 at Mid-Ohio was the twelfth round of the 2012 IndyCar Series season. It took place on Sunday, August 5, 2012. The race was contested over 85 laps at the  permanent road course at Mid-Ohio Sports Car Course in Lexington, Ohio, United States.

The race was won by New Zealand racer Scott Dixon racing for Chip Ganassi Racing. Dixon finished 3.4 seconds ahead of Australian driver Will Power driving for Team Penske with Frenchman Simon Pagenaud finishing third for Schmidt Hamilton Motorsports. It was Dixon's second win for the year and Pagenaud's third top three finish for the year. More significant, Power's second place compared to the results for Ryan Hunter-Reay and Power's teammate Hélio Castroneves, put Power back into the lead of the championship. The NBC Sports crew took over the ABC booth

Classification

Race results

Notes
 Points include 1 point for pole position and 2 points for most laps led.

Standings after the race

Drivers' Championship

Manufacturers' Championship

Note: Only the top five positions are included for the driver standings.

References

External links

Indy 200 at Mid-Ohio
Honda Indy 200 at Mid-Ohio
Honda Indy 200 at Mid-Ohio
Honda Indy 200 at Mid-Ohio